Levoberezhny is a rural locality (a settlement) in Krasnopolyanskoye Rural Settlement, Nikolsky District, Vologda Oblast, Russia. The population was 262 as of 2010. There are 8 streets.

Geography 
Levoberezhny is located 11 km southwest of Nikolsk (the district's administrative centre) by road. Osinovo is the nearest rural locality.

References 

Rural localities in Nikolsky District, Vologda Oblast